Glucosyltransferases are a type of glycosyltransferase that enable the transfer of glucose.

Examples include:
 glycogen synthase
 glycogen phosphorylase

They are categorized under EC number 2.4.1.

References

External links
 

EC 2.4